A particle velocity probe is a probe capable of measuring the acoustic particle velocity.

Currently there are two commercially available particle velocity probes. The first one is produced by Microflown Technologies. The particle velocity transducer is called the Microflown. The second particle velocity transducer is manufactured by Weles Acoustics. Both commercially available solutions share a similar transduction principle.

The Microflown sensor is a MEMS based transducer able to directly measure acoustic particle velocity. Very small sized elements are created on silicon wafers under a clean room technology. The sensing element consists of two ultra-thin wires (thinner than a strand of human hair). These wires are platinum resistors that act as temperature sensors. They are powered by an electrical current which causes them to heat up. Local temperature variations cause changes in the wires resistance. When the acoustic particle velocity (sound) propagates across the wires, it asymmetrically alters the temperature distribution around the resistors (wires). The resulting resistance difference provides a broad band (20 Hz up to at least 10 kHz) linear signal with a figure-of-eight directivity that is proportional to the acoustic particle velocity.

Literature 

Multiple application cases, theory and fundamentals of particle velocity sensing:
The Microflown e-Book.

List of academic publications related to particle velocity sensors:
General publication list of articles related to acoustic particle velocity. 

To model a tri-axial particle velocity probe's measurement of a source incident from the near field, see:
Y. I. Wu, K. T. Wong & S.-K. Lau, “The Acoustic Vector-Sensor’s Near-Field Array-Manifold,” IEEE Transactions on Signal Processing, vol. 58, no. 7, pp. 3946-3951, July 2010.
The tri-axial particle velocity probe's azimuth-elevation beam pattern: 
K. T. Wong & H. Chi, “Beam Patterns of an Underwater Acoustic Vector Hydrophone Located Away from any Reflecting Boundary,” IEEE Journal of Oceanic Engineering, vol. 27, no. 3, pp. 628-637, July 2002.
A  tri-axial particle velocity probe may be used to enhance speech reception in a video conferencing scenario:
Y. Wu, K. T. Wong, S.-K. Lau, X. Yuan & S. K. Tang, “A Directionally Tunable but Frequency-Invariant Beamformer on an Acoustic Velocity-Sensor Triad to Enhance Speech Perception,” Journal of the Acoustical Society of America, vol. 131, no. 5, pp. 3891-3902, May 2012.

External links 
 Microflown Technologies sensors
 Weles Acoustics particle velocity sensor - working principle 
Sound measurements